The 1926 Santa Barbara State Roadrunners football team represented Santa Barbara State during the 1926 college football season.

Santa Barbara State competed as an independent in 1926. Records may be incomplete, but six games have been documented. The Roadrunners were led by first-year head coach Dudley DeGroot and played home games at Peabody Stadium in Santa Barbara, California. They finished the season with a record of two wins and four losses (2–4). Overall, the team was outscored by its opponents 27–101 for the season and was shut out in four of the six games.

Schedule

Notes

References

Santa Barbara State
UC Santa Barbara Gauchos football seasons
Santa Barbara State Roadrunners football